The discography of the American country, pop, and novelty artist Ray Stevens consists of 50 studio albums, 125 singles, 3 live albums, 67 compilation albums, 3 box sets, and 1 extended play. Stevens released his first single in 1957 and his first full album in 1962. Dozens of Stevens' singles have charted on the Billboard Hot Country Songs chart and two of them reached #1 on the Billboard Hot 100 chart: "The Streak" and "Everything Is Beautiful". The former and a cover of the jazz standard "Misty" are his biggest hits on the country charts.

Studio albums

1960s

1970s

1980s

1990s

2000s

2010s

2020s

Live albums

EPs

Box sets

Compilation albums

Singles

1950s and 1960s

A^ "Sunday Mornin' Comin' Down" peaked at number 55 on U.S. Billboard Hot Country Singles and number 46 on Canada RPM Country Tracks.

1970s

1980s and 1990s

B^ "Shriner's Convention" peaked at number 1 on U.S. Billboard Bubbling Under Hot 100 Singles.

2000s, 2010s, & 2020s

Music videos
Ray Stevens recognized the power of the music video in the mid-80s and has been releasing them ever since. Ray released a direct-to-video collection of these videos in 1992 called "Ray Stevens Comedy Video Classics", which won Billboard Home Video of the Year in 1993. In 1995, Stevens released his film "Get Serious!" which consisted of several music videos. A series of animated videos were released between 2004-2008 which revisited many of Stevens' most popular hits. Ray returned to live action with a series of direct-to-YouTube music videos starting with 2009's "We The People". Some of Stevens' music videos have gone viral and most of them have garnered millions of unique views. In 2012, Stevens released a series of non-album Christmas music videos. Since then he has continued to sporadically release direct-to-YouTube music videos.

References

Country music discographies
 
 
Discographies of American artists
Comedian discographies